Business Readiness Rating (BRR) is a proposed rating system for use by open source software community.  It is hoped that the system will address testing and reliability requirements important in the enterprise environment, sharing and reducing the perceived TCO of open source software.

The system is currently in an RFC phase.

Sponsors include Carnegie Mellon Silicon Valley Center for Open Source Investigation, CodeZoo, SpikeSource, and Intel.

External links
Business Readiness Rating

Free software culture and documents